Below are lists of extant fern families and subfamilies using the classification scheme proposed by the Pteridophyte Phylogeny Group in 2016 (PPG I). The scheme is based on molecular phylogenetic studies, and also draws on earlier classifications, particularly those by Smith et al. (2006), Chase and Reveal (2009), and Christenhusz et al. (2011). It rejects the very broad circumscription of some families used by Christenhusz and Chase (2014), whose Aspleniaceae corresponds to the entire suborder Aspleniineae of PPG I.


Systematic order
Class Polypodiopsida Cronquist, Takht. & W.Zimm. (ferns, including horsetails)
Subclass Equisetidae Warm. (horsetails and scouring-rushes)
Order Equisetales DC. ex Bercht. & J.Presl
Family Equisetaceae Michx. ex DC
Subclass Ophioglossidae Klinge (whisk ferns, adder's-tongues and moonworts)
Order Psilotales Prant
Family Psilotaceae J.W.Griff. & Henfr.
Order Ophioglossales Link
Family Ophioglossaceae Martinov
Subfamily Helminthostachyoideae C.Presl
Subfamily Mankyuoideae J.R.Grant & B.Dauphin
Subfamily Ophioglossoideae C.Presl
Subfamily Botrychioideae C.Presl
Subclass Marattiidae Klinge (marattioid ferns)
Order Marattiales Link
Family Marattiaceae Kaulf
Subclass Polypodiidae Cronquist, Takht. & W.Zimm. (leptosporangiate ferns)
Order Osmundales Link (royal ferns)
Family Osmundaceae Martinov
Order Hymenophyllales A.B.Frank (filmy ferns and bristle ferns)
Family Hymenophyllaceae Mart
Subfamily Trichomanoideae C.Presl
Subfamily Hymenophylloideae Burnett
Order Gleicheniales Schimp
Family Matoniaceae C.Pres
Family Dipteridaceae Seward & E.Dale
Family Gleicheniaceae C.Presl
Order Schizaeales Schimp.
Family Lygodiaceae M.Roem
Family Schizaeaceae Kaulf
Family Anemiaceae Link
Order Salviniales Link
Family Salviniaceae Martinov
Family Marsileaceae Mirb.
Order Cyatheales A.B.Frank (tree ferns)
Family Thyrsopteridaceae C.Presl
Family Loxsomataceae C.Presl
Family Culcitaceae Pic.Serm
Family Plagiogyriaceae Bowe
Family Cibotiaceae Koral
Family Metaxyaceae Pic.Serm.
Family Dicksoniaceae M.R.Schomb.
Family Cyatheaceae Kaulf.
Order Polypodiales Link
Suborder Saccolomatineae Hovenkamp
Family Saccolomataceae Doweld
Suborder Lindsaeineae Lehtonen & Tuomist
Family Cystodiaceae J.R.Croft
Family Lonchitidaceae Doweld
Family Lindsaeaceae C.Presl ex M.R.Schomb.
Suborder Pteridineae J.Prado & Schuettp
Family Pteridaceae E.D.M.Kirchn.
Subfamily Parkerioideae Burnett
Subfamily Cryptogrammoideae S.Lindsay
Subfamily Pteridoideae Link
Subfamily Vittarioideae Link
Subfamily Cheilanthoideae Horvat
Suborder Dennstaedtiineae Schwartsb. & Hovenkamp
Family Dennstaedtiaceae Lotsy
Suborder Aspleniineae H.Schneid. & C.J.Rothf
Family Cystopteridaceae Shmakov
Family Rhachidosoraceae X.C.Zhang
Family Diplaziopsidaceae X.C.Zhang & Christenh.
Family Desmophlebiaceae Mynssen
Family Hemidictyaceae Christenh. & H.Schneid.
Family Aspleniaceae Newman
Family Woodsiaceae Herter
Family Onocleaceae Pic.Serm.
Family Blechnaceae Newman
Subfamily Stenochlaenoideae (Ching) J.P.Roux
Subfamily Woodwardioideae Gasper
Subfamily Blechnoideae Gasper, V.A.O.Dittrich & Salino
Family Athyriaceae Alston
Family Thelypteridaceae Ching ex Pic.Serm.
Subfamily Phegopteridoideae Salino, A.R.Sm. & T.E.Almeid
Subfamily Thelypteridoideae C.F.Reed
Suborder Polypodiineae Dumort.
Family Didymochlaenaceae Ching ex Li Bing Zhang & Liang Zhang
Family Hypodematiaceae Ching
Family Dryopteridaceae Herter
Subfamily Polybotryoideae H.M.Liu & X.C.Zhang
Subfamily Elaphoglossoideae (Pic.Serm.) Crabbe, Jermy & Mickel
Subfamily Dryopteridoideae Link
2 genera unassigned to a subfamily
Family Nephrolepidaceae Pic.Serm.
Family Lomariopsidaceae Alston
Family Tectariaceae Panigrahi
Family Oleandraceae Ching ex Pic.Serm.
Family Davalliaceae M.R.Schomb.
Family Polypodiaceae J.Presl & C.Presl
Subfamily Loxogrammoideae H.Schneid.
Subfamily Platycerioideae B.K.Nayar
Subfamily Drynarioideae Crabbe, Jermy & Mickel
Subfamily Microsoroideae B.K.Nayar
Subfamily Polypodioideae Sweet
Subfamily Grammitidoideae Parris & Sundue
1 genus unassigned to a subfamily

Alphabetic order
Anemiaceae Link (1 genus)
Aspleniaceae Newman (2 genera)
Athyriaceae Alston (3 genera)
Blechnaceae Newman (24 genera)
Cibotiaceae Koral (1 genus)
Culcitaceae Pic.Serm (1 genus)
Cyatheaceae Kaulf. (3 genera)
Cystodiaceae J.R.Croft (1 genus)
Cystopteridaceae Shmakov (3 genera)
Davalliaceae M.R.Schomb. (1 genus)
Dennstaedtiaceae Lotsy (10 genera)
Desmophlebiaceae Mynssen (1 genus)
Dicksoniaceae M.R.Schomb. (3 genera)
Didymochlaenaceae Ching ex Li Bing Zhang & Liang Zhang (1 genus)
Diplaziopsidaceae X.C.Zhang & Christenh. (2 genera)
Dipteridaceae Seward & E.Dale (2 genera)
Dryopteridaceae Herter (26 genera)
Equisetaceae Michx. ex DC (1 genus)
Gleicheniaceae C.Presl (6 genera)
Hemidictyaceae Christenh. & H.Schneid. (1 genus)
Hymenophyllaceae Mart (9 genera)
Hypodematiaceae Ching (2 genera)
Lindsaeaceae C.Presl ex M.R.Schomb. (7 genera)
Lomariopsidaceae Alston (4 genera)
Lonchitidaceae Doweld (1 genus)
Loxsomataceae C.Presl (2 genera)
Lygodiaceae M.Roem (1 genus)
Marattiaceae Kaulf (6 genera)
Marsileaceae Mirb. (3 genera)
Matoniaceae C.Pres (2 genera)
Metaxyaceae Pic.Serm. (1 genus)
Nephrolepidaceae Pic.Serm. (1 genus)
Oleandraceae Ching ex Pic.Serm. (1 genus)
Onocleaceae Pic.Serm. (4 genera)
Ophioglossaceae Martinov (10 genera)
Osmundaceae Martinov (6 genera)
Plagiogyriaceae Bowe (1 genus)
Polypodiaceae J.Presl & C.Presl (65 genera)
Psilotaceae J.W.Griff. & Henfr. (2 genera)
Pteridaceae E.D.M.Kirchn. (53 genera)
Rhachidosoraceae X.C.Zhang (1 genus)
Saccolomataceae Doweld (1 genus)
Salviniaceae Martinov (2 genera)
Schizaeaceae Kaulf (2 genera)
Tectariaceae Panigrahi (7 genera)
Thelypteridaceae Ching ex Pic.Serm. (30 genera)
Thyrsopteridaceae C.Presl (1 genus)
Woodsiaceae Herter (1 genus)

References

 01
.

Fern families